Cornel Țălnar (born 9 June 1957) is a Romanian football manager and former player.

Club career
Cornel Țălnar, nicknamed "Țânțarul" (The Mosquito), was born on 9 June 1957 in Bărăbanț, Alba County and started to play at the junior squads of Unirea Alba Iulia. He played his first Divizia A match on 21 August 1977 representing Dinamo București in a 0–0 against SC Bacău. He spent a total of 8 seasons playing for Dinamo, winning three consecutive Divizia A titles from 1982 until 1984, in the first he contributed with 2 goals scored in 30 matches, in the second he played 23 games and scored 4 goals and in the third he made 30 appearances and scored one goal, he also won two cups and played 27 games and scored 4 goals in European competitions, managing to reach the semi-finals in the 1983–84 European Cup campaign in which he contributed with one goal scored in 7 matches. After his spell with The Red Dogs ended, Țălnar went to play for Brașov, Victoria București and Petrolul Ploiești, earning a total of 297 matches and 33 goals scored in Divizia A and 31 matches played and four goals scored in European competitions. He ended his career playing three seasons in his native Alba County for Divizia B team Unirea Alba Iulia.

International career
Cornel Țălnar played six matches for Romania, making his debut on 1 June 1979 when coach Ștefan Kovacs sent him on the field in the 74th minute in order to replace Mihai Romilă in a friendly which ended with a 1–0 loss against East Germany. His following three games were friendlies and the last two were a 1–0 home victory against Norway and a 2–1 away loss against Switzerland at the 1982 World Cup qualifiers.

Managerial career
Cornel Țălnar started his career as manager in 1989, being a player-coach at Divizia B team, Unirea Alba Iulia. He managed several clubs in Romania, being coach at Dinamo on five occasions. In 2013, he had his only coaching experience outside of Romania, in Oman's second league at Oman Club. Țălnar has a total of 157 games managed in Liga I consisting of 63 victories, 39 draws and 55 losses.

Personal life
His nephew, Gheorghe Grozav is also a footballer.

Honours

Player
Dinamo București
Divizia A: 1981–82, 1982–83, 1983–84
Cupa României: 1981–82, 1983–84

Coach
FC Brașov
Divizia B: 1998–99

References

External links

1957 births
Sportspeople from Alba Iulia
Living people
Romanian footballers
Romania international footballers
CSM Unirea Alba Iulia players
FC Dinamo București players
FC Brașov (1936) players
FC Petrolul Ploiești players
Liga I players
Liga II players
Romanian football managers
CSM Unirea Alba Iulia managers
FC Inter Sibiu managers
FC Dinamo București managers
FC Universitatea Cluj managers
CSM Ceahlăul Piatra Neamț managers
FC Brașov (1936) managers
CS Concordia Chiajna managers
CS Luceafărul Oradea managers
Association football wingers